Borek Mały  is a village in the administrative district of Gmina Ostrów, within Ropczyce-Sędziszów County, Subcarpathian Voivodeship, in south-eastern Poland.

References

Villages in Ropczyce-Sędziszów County